Margo Elaine Simms, known professionally as Margeaux, is a Canadian singer, songwriter, fashion designer and television personality. She appeared on the VH1 reality television series Love & Hip Hop: Atlanta. Born in Toronto, Canada, she first pursued her music career in 2004. While attending Ryerson University, where she studied fashion design, Margeaux first started singing mostly on hip hop tracks. In 2005, she moved to New York City to become a fashion designer, but soon decided to start a career as a professional musician. She formed the group Test Drive with Nikko London and together they worked with producers such as Timbaland, Danja and The Runners along with DJ Khaled.

After an unsuccessful record deal with Universal, Margeaux moved to Los Angeles and began working on her solo material. She released her debut EP, Animal House, in 2010 under the name Margo. She went on to work on various music projects including the dubstep duo Invaderz, with Nikko London and joining the band Roma!, after her return to New York City. In 2015, Margeaux joined the cast of Love & Hip Hop: Atlanta.

Early life
Margeaux was born Margo Elaine Simms in Toronto, Ontario, Canada. She is of Jamaican descent. Her father was a chemist and he died when Margeaux was 24 years old. She has two sisters, Carla and Roxy.

Career

2005–09: Career beginnings and Test Drive
Margeaux first started writing songs at the age of 14. She later enrolled at the Ryerson University in Toronto where she studied fashion design. After finishing college, she moved to New York City, New York to pursue her career as a fashion designer. She interned with the designer Betsey Johnson but soon decided she wanted to become a professional musician and put together the group Test Drive. They worked with producers such as Timbaland, Danja and The Runners along with DJ Khaled.

2010–13: Animal House, Invaderz and Roma!
Margeaux released her debut EP, Animal House, in September 2010 and announced that she was working on a full-length album called Gunpowder. On November 2, she released the song "Walking In L.A." – a cover version of Missing Persons' song of the same name, accompanied by a music video. In 2011, Margeaux started working on a new project with Nikko London, called Invaderz. The duo released their dubstep mixtape Just Landed on September 19.

In 2012, Margeaux moved back to New York City and in August, she joined the rock band Roma! under the stage name "Bomba!". However, she departed from the band by the end of the year. Around the same time, she started working at the nightclub and concert venue Webster Hall as a bartender.

2014–present: Love & Hip Hop: Atlanta and Black Cocaine
In January 2014, she appeared in an episode of an online docu-series Second Skin for the website StyleLikeU. In April 2015, it was announced that Margeaux would appear on the fourth season of the VH1 reality television series Love & Hip Hop: Atlanta alongside her husband Nikko London. His sex tape with Mimi Faust was the main subject of the season. That same year, she released her single "Start a War", which she also performed on the show. In September, Margeaux announced that her EP, Yellow Dirty Rose, would be released later that month.
On June 15, 2017, Margeaux released a music video for "Bad Chick" as the lead single from her upcoming EP Black Cocaine (2017) scheduled to be released on June 23.

Other ventures

Fashion

Besides her music career, Margeaux has her own creative brand House of Margeaux which consists of a clothing line and hand painted skateboard line called Tokiebow. "House of Margeaux, HOFM, actually started out as merchandising for the music. I really wanted it to be just cool stuff for girls and guys, unisex, that people really wanted to wear; not just come to my show and then it's like my face and my name is there. I wanted it to be something separate from me but part of everything artistic that I do. I studied design so I really wanted to do really cool merchandise stuff that people wanted to rock all the time. And House of Margeaux is this creative place that has all these different rooms of things that I create. Like House of Margeaux HOFM is like the gear in one room and then the other room is Tokiebow, this character that I created. He rides a skateboard so I started hand painting skateboards and he's a vinyl robot toy, he's a comic book, T-shirts and hats. And then the other room is music. So House of Margeaux is just this creative hub where everything that I do lives and exists and collides together."

Personal life
Margeaux married her boyfriend and long-time music collaborator, Nikko London, in 2007. In August 2014, it was announced that she had been secretly married to London.

Discography
 Animal House (2010)
 Black Cocaine (2017)

Filmography

References

External links
 

Living people
1984 births
21st-century Canadian women singers
Alternative hip hop musicians
Canadian electronic musicians
Canadian fashion designers
Canadian women guitarists
Canadian women singer-songwriters
Canadian hip hop singers
Canadian people of Jamaican descent
Canadian pop guitarists
Canadian rock guitarists
Canadian songwriters
Feminist musicians
Canadian LGBT rights activists
Musicians from Toronto
Toronto Metropolitan University alumni
Singers from New York City
Songwriters from New York (state)
Synth-pop singers
Canadian women in electronic music
Canadian women pop singers
Participants in American reality television series
Guitarists from New York City
21st-century American women singers
21st-century American women guitarists
21st-century American guitarists
21st-century American singers
Canadian women fashion designers